Mohamed Hacene Bengrina known as Mustapha Bengrina (born March 24, 1996) is an Algerian footballer who plays for MC Oran in the Algerian Ligue Professionnelle 1. He plays primarily as an attacking midfielder.

References

External links
 

1996 births
Living people
Algerian Ligue Professionnelle 1 players
Algerian footballers
CR Belouizdad players
USM Alger players
MC Oran players
People from Ouargla
Association football midfielders
21st-century Algerian people